Vestec may refer to:

Vestec (Náchod District)
Vestec (Nymburk District)
Vestec (Prague-West District)
Nový Vestec
Starý Vestec